Raúl Gonzalo Cuero Rengifo (born 1948 in Buenaventura, Colombia) is a Colombian professor of microbiology.  From 1988 through 2012 he was a professor at Prairie View A&M University researching biological resistance to ultraviolet light.  The work was supported in part by NASA and led to at least one publication and patent.  During this period, Colombian media portrayed Cuero as "one of the greatest scientists in the world" who was internationally acknowledged as one of the greatest Colombian inventors, stated he had over 100 publications in scientific journals, and claimed he had won a significant award from NASA. Since 2012, he has been the research director of International Park of Creativity, an organization of which he is the founder.

References

External links
Raul Cuero's website

Living people
Microbiologists
Colombian biologists
Prairie View A&M University people
People from Buenaventura, Valle del Cauca
University of Valle alumni
Heidelberg University (Ohio) alumni
1948 births
Colombian people of African descent